The 1993 Roller Hockey World Cup was the thirty-first roller hockey world cup, organized by the Fédération Internationale de Roller Sports. It was contested by 12 national teams (8 from Europe, 2 from South America, 1 from North America and 1 from Africa). The tournament was played in the cities of Bassano del Grappa and Sesto San Giovanni, in Italy. This edition marks the debut of Andorra national hockey team.

Group stage

Group A

Group B

Final phase

9th to 12th play-off

Final round

Standings

See also
 FIRS Roller Hockey World Cup

External links
 1993 World Cup in rink-hockey.net historical database

Roller Hockey World Cup
International roller hockey competitions hosted by Italy
1993 in roller hockey
1993 in Italian sport